The 2002 MAC Championship Game was played on December 7, 2002 at Marshall Stadium, now known as Joan C. Edwards Stadium, in Huntington, West Virginia.  The game featured the winner of each division of the Mid-American Conference. The game featured the Marshall Thundering Herd, of the East Division, and the Toledo Rockets, of the West Division. The Thundering Herd beat the Rockets 49–45.

References

Championship Game
MAC Championship Game
Marshall Thundering Herd football games
Toledo Rockets football games
December 2002 sports events in the United States
MAC Championship Game